Victoria Roycroft ( Rose, born 17 April 1953) is an Australian equestrian who competed at three Olympic Games. She was born in Sydney. At the 1984 Games she competed in the three-day eventing, whereas at the 1988 and 1996 Games she competed in the show jumping. She also coached at the 1992 Games.

In 1987, Roycroft, on her horse Apache, won the Rome Grand Prix, the first Australian and first woman to do so.

She was married to fellow triple Olympian Wayne Roycroft from 1976 until their separation in 2000. The couple's son Mark died in 2003 at the age of 17 after being caught in a rip off Birdie Beach in the Munmorah State Conservation Area.

In 2000, she received an Australian Sports Medal.

References

External links 
 
 
 
 

1953 births
Australian female equestrians
Living people
Olympic equestrians of Australia
Equestrians at the 1984 Summer Olympics
Equestrians at the 1988 Summer Olympics
Equestrians at the 1996 Summer Olympics
Recipients of the Australian Sports Medal
20th-century Australian women